Thornborough may refer to:

Places
Thornborough, Buckinghamshire, England
Thornborough, North Yorkshire, England
Thornborough Henges
Thornborough, Queensland, Australia

Ships
, a frigate in Royal Navy service 1943–1945

See also
Thornbrough, North Yorkshire, England